Benjamin Robert (born 4 January 1998) is a French middle-distance runner specialising in the 800 metres. He won a bronze medal at the 2018 World U20 Championships.

International competitions

Personal bests
Outdoor
400 metres – 47.94 (Toulouse 2017)
800 metres – 1:43.75 (Paris 2022)
1500 metres – 3:50.97 (Toulouse 2018)
Indoor
400 metres – 48.53 (Aubiére 2018)
800 metres – 1:46.06 (Miramas 2021)
1500 metres – 3:47.08 (Reims 2020)

References

1998 births
Living people
French male middle-distance runners
Sportspeople from Toulouse
Athletes (track and field) at the 2020 Summer Olympics
Olympic athletes of France
20th-century French people
21st-century French people